José Manuel Marques da Silva Pureza (born 18 December 1958) is a Portuguese sociology professor and politician. A member of the Left Bloc, he was elected to the Assembly of the Republic, for the first time, in 2009, but failed to secure his re-election in 2011, having returned for a second period, after being elected again, in 2015. In the 2006 presidential election, he was the nationwide representative of the candidacy of Francisco Louçã.

References

1958 births
People from Coimbra
Living people
Portuguese academics
Portuguese sociologists
Left Bloc politicians
20th-century Portuguese politicians
21st-century Portuguese politicians
Portuguese Roman Catholics
University of Coimbra alumni